This page documents the tornadoes and tornado outbreaks of 1984, primarily in the United States. Most tornadoes form in the U.S., although some events may take place internationally. Tornado statistics for older years like this often appear significantly lower than modern years due to fewer reports or confirmed tornadoes.

Synopsis

1984 was a very busy and deadly year for tornadoes. There were 907 tornadoes recorded, including 15 of F4 or greater strength, the most this powerful since 1976. A total of 122 people were killed in 1984, the most since 1974, and a mark that would not again be surpassed until 1998. The most notable tornado events included the deadly March 28 Carolinas outbreak and the killer F5 tornado which hit Barneveld, Wisconsin on June 8.

Events
Confirmed tornado total for the entire year 1984 in the United States.

January
There was 1 tornado confirmed in the US in January.

January 13 
The only tornado of the entire month was an F0 tornado that briefly touched down near Huntington Beach, California, causing $2,500 (1984 USD) in damage and no fatalities or injuries.

February
There were 27 tornadoes confirmed in the US in February.

February 27
A F3 tornado struck Mayo, Florida, injuring one person and causing $250,000 (1984 USD) in damage.

March
There were 73 tornadoes confirmed in the US in March.

March 15

An F4 tornado in Arkansas killed five people as it impacted Clinton, Arkansas. A second F4 tornado in the state killed two more people.

March 28

The 1984 Carolinas tornado outbreak of March 28, 1984 was the most destructive tornado outbreak to sweep through the two states since the Enigma tornado outbreak struck 100 years and 1 month earlier, according to NOAA and NCDC public records. 24 tornadoes (seven of F4 strength) resulted in 57 fatalities and over one thousand injuries.

April
There were 176 tornadoes confirmed in the US in April.

April 21

An F3 tornado in Mississippi killed 16 people.

April 26–27
On April 26, an F3 tornado in Okmulgee County, Oklahoma killed eight people. An even stronger F4 tornado killed three more people in Terlton, Oklahoma. One person was also killed by a tornado in Minnesota before more tornadoes on April 27 killed four in Wisconsin, including one from an F4 tornado that affected Milwaukee's western suburbs, and Illinois.

May
There were 169 tornadoes confirmed in the US in May.

May 3
A tornado outbreak spawned 38 tornadoes, including an F3 tornado that killed five people in Alabama.

May 8
Another tornado outbreak in the Mid-Atlantic produced several tornadoes, including a killer tornado on the Delmarva Peninsula, which claimed one life, caused six injuries and damaged a large chicken house in Dorchester County, Maryland (near Hurlock) before moving into Sussex County, Delaware injuring five more people and damaging a mobile home. Damage in Maryland was estimated between 500,000 and 5 million dollars.

June
There were 242 tornadoes confirmed in the US in June.

June 7–8

An extremely destructive tornado outbreak took place across the central United States from North Dakota to Kansas in early June. Several significant tornadoes touched down, including an F5 tornado which traveled through Barneveld, Wisconsin in the early morning hours of June 8. The entire outbreak killed at least 13 people across three states, nine of whom died in Barneveld alone.

June 9 (Soviet Union)
 

A rare and destructive tornado outbreak took place in the Soviet Union, mainly impacting the Ivanovo and Yaroslavl regions located north of Moscow. One tornado in the outbreak produced F4 damage, while another (possibly the same as the Ivanovo tornado) was rated as F4. The outbreak resulted in at least 57 fatalities, though some sources claim that the actual death toll surpasses 400. 804 people were injured by the tornadoes.

July
There were 72 tornadoes confirmed in the US in July.

July 18
An F2 tornado hit Sussex County, Delaware (near Greenwood) just two months after being hit by a tornado that caused a death in Maryland, but this tornado resulted in no fatalities or injuries. This was one of only two significant tornadoes to hit Sussex County.

August
There were 47 tornadoes confirmed in the US in August.

August 8
An F3 tornado hit Flint, Michigan without causing any fatalities or injuries.

September
There were 17 tornadoes confirmed in the US in September.

September 2
A F3 tornado impacted Sanilac County and St. Clair County, Michigan, injuring one person and causing $5 million (1984 USD) in damage.

October
There were 49 tornadoes confirmed in the US in October.

October 31
An F3 tornado hit Mutual, Oklahoma without causing any fatalities.

November
There were 30 tornadoes confirmed in the US in November.

November 9
A F2 tornado impacted the city of Potosi, Missouri, killing one person, injuring 15 others, and causing $25 million (1984 USD) in damage.

November 23 (Germany)

Three tornadoes occurred in Germany, including a significant tornado, rated F2/T5 by the European Severe Storms Laboratory, that impacted Zöllnitz, Germany, injuring one person.

December
There were 4 tornadoes confirmed in the US in December.

December 13
A north-moving F3 tornado impacted the eastern portion of the Dallas–Fort Worth metroplex, injuring 28 people and causing $25 million (1984 USD) in damage.

See also
 Tornado
 Tornadoes by year
 Tornado records
 Tornado climatology
 Tornado myths
 List of tornado outbreaks
 List of F5 and EF5 tornadoes
 List of North American tornadoes and tornado outbreaks
 List of 21st-century Canadian tornadoes and tornado outbreaks
 List of European tornadoes and tornado outbreaks
 List of tornadoes and tornado outbreaks in Asia
 List of Southern Hemisphere tornadoes and tornado outbreaks
 List of tornadoes striking downtown areas
 Tornado intensity
 Fujita scale
 Enhanced Fujita scale

References

External links
 U.S. tornadoes in 1984 - Tornado History Project
 Tornado deaths monthly

 
1984 meteorology
Tornado-related lists by year
Torn